Anna Ivanovna Abrikosova (23 January 1882 – 23 July 1936), later known as Mother Catherine of Siena, O.P. (transcribed Ekaterina Sienskaya), was a Russian Greek-Catholic religious sister, literary translator, and victim of Joseph Stalin's concentration camps. She was also the foundress of a Byzantine Catholic community of the Third Order of St. Dominic which has gained wide attention, even among secular historians of Soviet repression. In an anthology of women's memoirs from the GULAG, historian Veronica Shapovalova describes Anna Abrikosova as, "a woman of remarkable erudition and strength of will", who, "managed to organize the sisters in such a way that even after their arrest they continued their work." Furthermore, because Soviet dissident Alexander Solzhenitsyn interviewed surviving Greek-Catholic Dominican Sister Nora Rubashova in Moscow during his research process, Mother Catherine and the persecution of her monastic community are mentioned briefly in the first volume of The Gulag Archipelago.

Since 2002, Abrikosova's life has been under scrutiny for possible beatification by the Holy See, as one of those whom Fr. Christopher Zugger has termed, "The Passion bearers of the Russian Catholic Exarchate". Her current title is Servant of God.

Early life
Anna Ivanovna Abrikosova was born on 23 January 1882 in Kitaigorod, Moscow, Russian Empire. Although her ancestors had only recently been peasant serfs belonging to the Russian nobility in Penza Governorate, by the time of Anna's birth, the Abrikosovs were a fabulously wealthy family of industrialists and philanthropists. The Abrikosov family ran a company which was the official supplier of confections, gingerbread, candies, and jams to the Russian Imperial Court and had accordingly been raised to the hereditary nobility by Tsar Alexander III. Anna's grandfather, the industrialist Alexei Ivanovich Abrikosov, was the founder of the family fortune. Her father, Ivan Alexeievich Abrikosov, was expected to take over the family firm until his premature death from tuberculosis. Her brothers included senior Russian Foreign Office official Dmitri Ivanovich Abrikosov and Alexei Ivanovich Abrikosov, the doctor who embalmed Vladimir Lenin and later served as the personal physician to Joseph Stalin. Anna's cousin and adopted brother Khrisanf Abrikosov was a close friend of novelist Leo Tolstoy and a senior member of the latter's religious movement.

Although the younger members of the family rarely attended Divine Liturgy, the Abrikosovs regarded themselves as pillars of the Russian Orthodox Church.

The memoirs of Anna's brother Dmitrii allege that their parents had longed for a daughter, but that their mother, Anna Dmitrievna (née Arbuzova), died while giving birth to Anna, and their father died ten days later, of tuberculosis.

A "Family Chronicle" by Khrisanf Abrikosov, however, alleges that Anna's mother, who was suffering from postpartum depression and unable to face the imminent death of her husband from tuberculosis, in reality committed suicide by taking poison. Khrisanf further alleges that this fact was carefully concealed from Anna and her brothers.

Following their deaths, Ivan and Anna Abrikosov were buried in the Aleksei Cemetery in Moscow, under an inscription which Ivan's father had chosen from the Book of Isaiah: "My thoughts are not your thoughts; neither are your ways My ways. For as the heavens are higher than the earth, so are My ways higher than your ways, and My thoughts higher than your thoughts."

As their father had stipulated before he died, Anna and her four brothers were adopted and raised by their paternal uncle, Nikolai Alekseevich Abrikosov.

Dmitrii Abrikosov later recalled, "We were healthy children, quickly became friends with our new brothers and sisters, and filled the big house of our uncle with perpetual noise. When I was older I often asked how my uncle and aunt, who were both young, loved to have a social life and receive guests, could so readily have reconciled themselves to the doubling of family. The answer lay, of course in their wonderful character. My uncle... had no interest in the innumerable businesses created by my grandfather and passed his spare time in his library or the laboratory. The habit of meditating about higher matters made a real philosopher of him; unperturbed by the little things of this life, he faced all difficulties with absolute calmness. He never regretted what might have been, and was always reconciled with the facts of life."

Dmitrii continues, "His wife, my aunt Vera, with whom he lived for fifty-three years through all the vicissitudes of fortune, was his chief support in life. She was a wonderfully nice and exceptionally refined person, never angry and equally kind to everybody; to her relatives and friends, the ten (and after the birth of another boy eleven) children and the numerous nurses, housekeepers, governesses, and other servants rich Russian families in days past. As a result everybody thought only of pleasing her."

Every year, the summers were spent at "The Oaks", a country estate at Tarasovka, Moscow Governorate, which Nikolai Abrikosov had purchased from an ethnic German businessman. The rest of the year was spent in the family's Moscow house near Chistye Prudy. The latter home had reportedly been a prison during the 18th-century and had survived the Great Fire of Moscow in 1812. Chains were sometimes still visible on the walls and the house was said, by the servants, to be haunted by the ghost of Vanka Kain, an infamous, "gangster, kidnapper, [and] burglar", who was, "the scourge of Moscow during the 1730s and '40s", and who, despite eventually becoming a police informant, remained a local folk hero.

The memoirs of Dmitrii Abrikosov "describes their childhood as carefree and joyous" and writes that their English governess "was quite shocked at the close relationship between parents and children." She used to say that in England, "children were seen and not heard." Due to having been raised by an English governess, Anna Abrikosova always spoke the Russian language with a slight British upper class accent.

Education
Desiring to be a teacher, Anna graduated with Gold Medal Grade from the First Women's Lyceum in Moscow in 1899. She then entered a teacher's college, where the all-female student body ostracized and bullied her for being from a wealthy family.

Anna later told Lady Dorothy Howard, "Every day as I went into the room the girls would divide up the passage and stand aside not to brush me as I passed because they hated me as one of the privileged class."

After graduating, she briefly taught at a Russian Orthodox parochial school but was forced to leave after the priest threatened to denounce her to the Okhrana for teaching the students that Hell does not exist. Although heartbroken, Anna then decided to pursue an old dream of attending Girton College, the all-girls adjunct to Cambridge University.

Her brother Dmitrii Ivanovich later wrote, "In those days Russian girls did not think of amusement but of study, going on to the university, studying medicine, and mixing in politics. My sister was not an exception to the general rule, but under the influence of our English governess chose an English college; the whole family approved wholeheartedly, for thereby she would be free from politics and the pressure to bow down to the tyranny of solidarity in holding extreme views expected of serious women."

With her brother Dmitrii acting as her chaperone during the journey to England, Anna first visited their brother Ivan, who was studying mathematics at the University of Heidelberg. After briefly sightseeing and listening to the lectures of Prof. Kuno Fischer, Anna and Dmitrii Abrikosov continued on to Girton College, where he left his sister behind.

While studying history from 1901 to 1903, Anna Abrikosova, according to a 1936 obituary written by Hélène Iswolsky and published in l'Année Dominicaine, was given the nickname "In Dead Earnest", by her fellow students.

She also befriended Lady Dorothy Georgiana Howard, the daughter of the 9th Earl and "Radical Countess" of Carlisle. While at Girton, Lady Dorothy, who later became a prominent suffragette, wrote regular letters to her mother, which remain one of the best sources for Anna's college days.

Another member of Anna Abrikosova's six closest friends at Girton College was the future archaeologist Gisela Richter, who was studying Classics. Richter later wrote, "A friend whom I especially was valued was Ania Abrikossova (sic). She, so to speak, introduced me to Russia, for through her I met her relatives and friends, all of whom were more or less refugees (under the Czarist regime)."

At this time, Anna's cousin and adopted brother Khrisanf Abrikosov was living with many fellow Russian political exiles at the Tolstoyan commune in Croydon, Surrey.

According to Richter, their friendship began during the first year at Girton and, by the second year, all seven girls were allowed to change their rooms and "decided to have quarters close to one another".  Richter added, "As was customary at that time, we were photographed together." Richter alleges that all seven friendships, "lasted all our lives."

Richter also alleges in her memoirs that "during the vacations we visited each other's families" and that Anna was along during visits to Lady Dorothy's relatives, and that they were honored guests at Castle Howard in Yorkshire and Naworth Castle in Cumbria.

Marriage
Lady Dorothy Howard's letters make occasional references to Anna Abrikosova receiving attentions from aristocratic suitors. One was codenamed "Prince So-and-So". The other, whom Howard referred to only as "Sandro", was alleged in a letter dated January 18, 1904, either, "out of dispetto", ("spite") or having possibly, "ceased to care for Ania", to have recently become engaged to a princess and junior member of the British royal family.

According to experts, however, on the culture of the Kupechestvo ("The Russian Merchant Class") during the last decades of the House of Romanov, intermarriage between elite Moscow mercantile families and the aristocracy was widely frowned upon, as aristocratic suitors were widely presumed to be golddiggers. This would have been even more the case in Anna Abrikosova's immediate family. Her paternal grandmother had forced her 17-year old aunt, Glafira Abrikosova, into an arranged marriage to a much older member of the Russian nobility, who had no intention of remaining faithful. After a scandalous and almost immediate separation, Anna's adopted father, Nikolai Abrikosov, had defied the orders of their mother and had taken his sister in. Nikolai Abrikosov then spent the next decade bribing corrupt civil service officials working in the Most Holy Synod until he finally obtained the signature of Tsar Alexander III on a document granting his sister Glafira an Orthodox ecclesiastical divorce.

Very likely, these were both among the reasons why, after Anna Abrikosova left Girton College without receiving a degree, she returned to Moscow and accepted a marriage proposal from her first cousin, Vladimir Abrikosov.

At the time, Anna's brother, Dmitrii Abrikosov, had become a highly ambitious diplomat and was stationed by the Foreign Office at the Russian Embassy in London, which was then located at Chesham House, Belgravia. Dmitrii Abrikosov later recalled of his sister, "She had been my closest friend during my stay in England. I was proud of her. She was a brilliant girl..."

On the other hand, Dmitrii Abrikosov considered their cousin Vladimir to be, "a complete nonentity" and, "a young fop, constantly admiring himself in the mirror". Therefore, Dmitrii Abrikosov was horrified to learn of his sister's engagement. He later recalled, "When she wrote to me about her feelings I was horrified and promptly warned her that it was madness. I even wrote to my father asking him to stop this nonsense, but with his usual philosophy he replied that it was a law of nature for strong characters to be attracted to weaklings, because in their love there was always a touch of motherly feeling. Unimpressed, I continued my attempts to change my sister's mind, not sparing in my letters the object of her affections, with the result that one day I received a short note in which she pointed out that I had forgotten one thing, namely that she loved him. It was the end of our friendship."

During the preparation of Dmitrii Abrikosov's memoirs for publication in the early 1960s, Anna's cousin and adopted brother, Mr. Pavel Nikolaevich Abrikosov of Montreal, assisted editor George Alexander Lensen. According to Pavel Abrikosov, Anna and Vladimir, as first cousins, had difficulty obtaining an Orthodox wedding. Pavel further alleged that, in response, his adopted sister began showing interest for the first time in Catholicism, but implied that an Orthodox wedding was successfully arranged.

Catholicism
The Abrikosovs spent the next decade traveling in the Kingdom of Italy, Switzerland and France. A major role in Anna's conversion to Catholicism was played by her friendship with Princess Maria Mikhailovich Volkonskaya.

According to Father Cyril Korolevsky:While traveling, she studied a great deal. She... read a number of Catholic books. She particularly liked the Dialogue of Saint Catherine of Siena and began to doubt official Orthodoxy more and more. Finally, she approached the parish priest of the large, aristocratic Church of the Madeleine in Paris, Abbé Maurice Rivière, who later became Bishop of Périgueux. He instructed and received her into the Catholic Church on 20 December 1908. Amazingly, especially at that time, he informed her that even though she had been received with the Latin Ritual, she would always canonically belong to the Greek-Catholic Church. She went on reading and came to prefer the Dominican spirituality and to enjoy Lacordaire's biography of Saint Dominic... She never stopped thinking of Russia, but like many other people, she thought that only the Roman Catholic priests were able to work with Russian souls. Little by little, she won her husband over to her religious convictions. On 21 December 1909, Vladimir was also received into the Catholic Church. They both thought they would stay abroad, where they had full freedom of religion and... a vague plan to join some monastery or semi-monastic community. Since they knew that according to the canons they were Greek-Catholics, they petitioned Pius X through a Roman prelate for permission to become Roman Catholics -- they considered this a mere formality. To their great surprise the Pope refused outright... and reminded them of the provisions of Orientalium dignitas. They had just received this answer when a telegram summoned them to Moscow for family reasons.

Moscow
The couple returned to Russia in 1910. Upon their return, the Abrikosovs found a group of Dominican tertiaries which had been established earlier by one Natalia Rozanova. They were received into the Third Order of St. Dominic by Friar Albert Libercier, O.P., of the Roman Catholic Church of St. Louis in Moscow. 

According to a 1936 article by Hélène Iswolsky, Anna and Vladimir Abrilosova learned after the February Revolution that they had been under Okhrana surveillance and that only the abdication of Tsar Nicholas II had prevented them from imminent arrest.

On 19 May 1917, Vladimir was ordained to the priesthood by Metropolitan Andrey Sheptytsky of the Ukrainian Greek-Catholic Church. Even though the ordination of married men to the priesthood is allowed by the canon law of the Eastern Catholic Churches, the Abrikosovs had already taken a vow of chastity in a ritual which the rule of the Dominican Third Order at the time only very rarely permitted to married couples.

On the feast of St. Dominic in August 1917, Anna took vows as a Dominican Sister, assuming her religious name at that time, and founded a Greek-Catholic religious congregation of the Order in her Moscow apartment. Several of the women among the secular tertiaries joined her in taking vows as well. Thus was a community of the Dominican Third Order Regular, with Father Vladimir Abrikosov as its chaplain, established in what was soon to be Soviet Russia.

According to Father Georgii Friedman, "In addition to the three usual religious vows, the Sisters took a fourth vow, to suffer for the salvation of Russia. God heard their desire, and soon they were to suffer much, for many years."

Persecution
During the aftermath of the October Revolution, the convent was put under surveillance by the Soviet secret police.

On the night of 17 August 1922, the GPU raided the convent during Orthros. Father Vladimir Abrikosov, along with his protege and former Old Bolshevik Dmitry Kuzmin-Karavayev, were arrested and sentenced to the supreme penalty of death by shooting. The sentence, however, was commuted to perpetual exile and deportation to the West aboard the Philosopher's Ship. According to Lesley Chamberlain, every person deported aboard the ship had been hand-picked by Vladimir Lenin, who wished to rid himself of the first Soviet dissidents.

Soon after, Mother Catherine and her mother-in-law were offered the opportunity to leave the Soviet Union and join Father Vladimir as White emigres in Paris. Mother Catherine declined and wrote in a letter, "I  wish to live a uniquely supernatural life and to accomplish to the end my vow of immolation for the priests and for Russia."

For the children of parishioners who did not wish to expose their children to the forced indoctrination into Marxist-Leninist atheism common in the Soviet educational system, Mother Catherine, Father Nikolai, and the sisters founded a secret and illegal Catholic school. Sister Philomena Ejsmont later recalled, "Mother Catherine loved children; they always had access to her room and simply adored her."

Sister Anatolia Nowicka confirms this, adding, "At times the sound of children's laughter and merriment came from her room. Mother knew how to devise clever, fun diversions for the children. They idolized her."

One of the schoolchildren was Father Nikolai Alexandrov's daughter, Ekaterina Nikolaevna (née Alexandrova) Mikhailova. In a memoir written decades later, she recalled, "My entire childhood was spent within this community, at 23 Prechistenskii Boulevard, Apartment 34. It was a huge apartment. There was a chapel in one room and there was also a convent. During the day, it looked like any well-appointed apartment with a living room, kitchen, and everything else; but at night, at least thirty nuns were staying there. They all slept on the floor. But at that time, I did not know this. The atmosphere in the community was friendly, with everyone being hard workers and no one being forced to do anything against her will. We were like all other children, fed and cared for. For every New Year, wonderful festivities were arranged, with costume parties and skits. Quite a lot of people used to come. There was a rather large circle of laypeople, besides the nuns. There were about ten or twelve children."

Mother Catherine wrote Princess Volkonskaya a letter from Moscow, "I am, in the fullest sense of the word, alone with half naked children, with sisters who are wearing themselves out, with a youthful, wonderful, saintly but terribly young priest, Father Nikolai Alexandrov, who himself needs support, and with parishioners dismayed and bewildered, while I myself am waiting to be arrested, because when they searched here, they took away our Constitution and our rules."

Imprisonment
During the Russian famine of 1921-1922, a request for assistance from Patriarch Tikhon of Moscow to Pope Benedict XV was answered only through Cardinal Pietro Gasparri. According to a letter from Mother Catherine to Princess Volkonskaya, the Patriarch was deeply hurt by this, "and his kindness to us has been dampened." 

Mother Catherine was even more concerned when she learned in March 1922 that Fr. Edmund A. Walsh, an Irish-American Jesuit priest from Boston, would be directing the Papal Aid Mission. In a letter to Rome, she wrote, "Does Rome realize the terror and revulsion felt here until recently towards the Jesuits and the strange mood in which their arrival is awaited? It is something inexplicable, a characteristic trait of panic. If the Jesuits enter Russia in civilian dress, it will mean only the worst: their arrival here will be considered a giant Catholic conspiracy. One must thoroughly understand the psychology of the Russian attitude toward the Jesuits. In spite of my entire respect for this religious order, I must admit that it much not enter Russia. Its arrival here will be the ruin of all that has been accomplished." 

Mother Catherine was arrested by the OGPU.

According to the 1924 "Investigatory File of A.I. Abrikosova and Others" in the Central Archive of the FSB, the OGPU decided to interpret the convent and its tiny parochial school as a terrorist organization plotting to overthrow the Soviet Government and, "the organization of illegal schools for the education of children in a religious-fascist spirit". The nuns' co-conspirators were alleged to be the Holy See, the Republic of Lithuania, the Second Polish Republic, exiled Ukrainian People's Republic leader Symon Petliura, Metropolitan Andrey Sheptytsky of the Ukrainian Catholic Church, the Grand Duke Kiril Vladimirovich and the House of Romanov Government-in-Exile, "the Supreme Monarchist Council", and, "International Fascism."

Shortly before the Supreme Collegium of the OGPU handed down sentences, Mother Catherine told the sisters of her community, "Probably every one of you, having given your love to God and following in His way, has in your heart more than once asked Christ to grant you the opportunity to share in His sufferings. And so it is; the moment has now arrived. Your desire to suffer for His sake is now being fulfilled."

Mother Catherine was sentenced to ten years of solitary confinement and imprisoned at Yaroslavl from 1924 to 1932. After being diagnosed with breast cancer, she was transferred to Butyrka Prison infirmary for an operation in May 1932. The operation removed her left breast, part of the muscles on her back and side. She was left unable to use her left arm, but was deemed cancer free.

Release
Meanwhile, Ekaterina Peshkova, the wife of author Maxim Gorky and head of the Political Red Cross, had interceded with Stalin to secure her release and grounds of her illness and that her sentence was almost complete.

On August 13, 1932, Mother Catherine petitioned to be returned to Yaroslavl. Instead, she was told that she could leave any time she wanted. On August 14, she walked free from Butyrka and went directly to the Church of St. Louis des Français.

Bishop Pie Eugène Neveu, who had been secretly consecrated by Michel d'Herbigny as an underground Bishop in 1926, wrote to Rome after meeting her at St. Louis des Français, "This woman is a genuine preacher of the Faith and very courageous. One feels insignificant beside someone of this moral stature. She still cannot see well, and she can only use her right hand, since the left is paralyzed."

According to Dmitrii Abrikosov, "As for my sister, nothing was heard about her for nine years and even my eldest brother, who worked for the Soviets and became a prominent scientist, could do nothing for her. Then suddenly she reappeared in Moscow. Relatives who saw her wrote to my aunt in Paris that she gave the impression of a Saint."

Despite warnings that it could lead to another arrest, Mother Catherine also reestablished ties to the surviving Sisters. She later told interrogators, "After my release from the isolator and happening to be in Moscow, I renewed my links with a group of people whom an OGPU Collegium had condemned in 1923. In reestablishing contact with them, my purpose was to assess their political and spiritual condition after their arrest, administrative exile and the expiration of their residence restriction. Following my meetings with them, I became convinced that they retained their earlier world outlook."

Rearrest
After immediately entering communication with the surviving Sisters of the congregation, Mother Catherine was arrested, along with 24 other Catholics, in August 1933. In what the NKVD called "The Case of the Counterrevolutionary Terrorist-Monarchist Organization", Mother Catherine and her fellow nuns stood accused of forming a "terrorist organization", plotting to assassinate Joseph Stalin, overthrow the Communist Party of the Soviet Union, and restore the House of Romanov as a constitutional monarchy in concert with "international fascism" and "Papal theocracy". It was further alleged that the nuns planned to restore Capitalism and for collective farms to be privatized and returned to the kulaks and the Russian nobility. The NKVD further alleged that the nuns' terrorist activities were directed by Bishop Pie Eugène Neveu, the Vatican's Congregation for the Oriental Churches, and Pope Pius XI. After being declared guilty as charged, Mother Catherine was returned to the Political Isolator Prison at Yaroslavl.

Death and legacy

Abrikosova died of spinal cancer at Butyrka Prison infirmary on July 23, 1936, at the age of 54 years. After being autopsied, her body was secretly cremated at the Donskoy Cemetery and her ashes were buried in a mass grave at the same location.

According to Dmitrii Abrikosov, "Till her last moments she never thought of herself, and tried to help and support by her faith other unfortunate prisoners. Such is the fate of this remarkable woman. When I was in Japan, some Catholic told me that he had read in a Catholic magazine that the Church was collecting all data on her life with a view to possibly consecrating her as a Saint of the Catholic Church. How destiny plays with human life! ... - who could have believed all this possible, had anyone prophesied it? My sister herself would have called it the dream of a madman."

When news of Anna Abrikosova's death reached the large community of anti-communist Russians in Paris, an obituary was written in French by Hélène Iswolsky and published in l'Année Dominicaine.

About Mother Catherine and the Sisters, Bishop Neveu wrote in a dispatch to the Holy See, "They were heroines deserving our admiration... [and they have] added a glorious page to the history of our Holy Mother Church."

After her release from the Gulag in 1953, Abrikosova Dominican Sister Theresa Kugel became the driving force in the reunion of the surviving sisters and their monastic revival inside a Khrushchyovka apartment building on Dzuku Street in Vilnius. Georgii Davidovich Friedman, a Soviet Jewish jazz musician and recent Catholic convert who first visited them in 1974, found that the Sisters were being ministered to by Dominican priests visiting from the People's Republic of Poland and by Fr. Volodymyr Prokopiv, a graduate of the Russicum, fellow Gulag survivor, and priest of the illegal and underground Ukrainian Greek Catholic Church.

Friedman later recalled, "I remember how the atmosphere of quiet and peace in their quarters delighted me. On the walls hung large images of Saint Dominic and Saint Catherine of Siena. In the tiniest little chapel they had made an altar out of a dresser, and on the altar stood a crucifix. A lamp flickered in a beautiful vessel to show that the Blessed Sacrament was reserved there."

Following the collapse of the Soviet Union in 1991, some Russian Catholics, most of whom were directly linked to the surviving Abrikosov Dominican Sisters, began to appear in the open. At the same time, the history and martyrology of the Russian Greek Catholic Church under the Bolshevik Yoke began to be investigated.

In 2001, Exarch Leonid Feodorov was beatified during a ceremony held in Lviv by Pope John Paul II.

In 2003, the Causes for Beatification of six Soviet-era martyrs and confessors of the Russian Greek Catholic Church: Fabijan Abrantovich, Anna Abrikosova, Igor Akulov, Potapy Emelianov, Halina Jętkiewicz, and Andrzej Cikoto, were submitted to the Holy See's Congregation for the Causes of Saints by the Bishops of the Catholic Church in Russia.

Writings
While writing about time before the arrest of the community, Sister Philomena Ejsmont recalled, "In addition to her daily prayers and obligations, Mother Catherine still found time to translate spiritual texts - masterpieces of ascetic literature - into Russian for those Sisters who did not know foreign languages. She herself wrote some meditations based on the liturgical year and Dominican feast days."

In her work as a literary translator, Anna Abrikosova translated Jean-Baptiste Henri Lacordaire's biography of St. Dominic from French to Russian. Her translation was published anonymously in 1916 and was republished after the collapse of the Soviet Union in 1991.

Despite Mgr. Robert Hugh Benson's subtle contempt for the Eastern Catholic Churches and "Greek Christianity", Anna Abrikosova also translated his dystopian novel Lord of the World from English to Russian shortly before the Bolshevik Revolution. This translation, however, remained unpublished and is now considered to be lost.

According to Father Georgii Friedman, "The only composition of Mother Catherine that survived intact is The Seven Words of Christ on the Cross. It was not an exact copy that was preserved, but what we have gives us an idea of the very lofty spirituality of the author. I would even be so bold as to say that the level of this work is no less than the writings of Saint Theresa of Avila. Especially in The Third Word one can see the personal, burning pain of voluntary suffering borne by Mother Catherine - the renunciation, and then even the separation from, her ardently loved spouse. This work became, as it were, the spiritual-sacrificial program for the Sisters' life in her community."

Quotes
 "I wish to lead a uniquely supernatural life and to accomplish to the end my vow of immolation for the priests and for Russia."
 "Soviet youth cannot talk about its world outlook; it is blinkered. It is developing too one-sidedly, because it knows only the jargon of Marxist-Leninism."
 "A political and spiritual outlook should develop only on the basis of a free critical exploration of all the facets of philosophical and political thought."

Resources

Further reading
 Sr. Mary of the Sacred Heart, O.P. (2013), To Courageously Know and Follow After Truth: The Life and Work of Mother Catherine Abrikosova, DNS Publications
 The Servant of God Mother Catherine Abrikosova, T.O.S.D. (2019), The Seven Last Words of Our Lord Upon the Cross, Translated by Joseph Lake and Brendan D. King. St. Augustine's Press, South Bend, Indiana.

External links
 [https://www.findagrave.com/memorial/235582562/anna-ivanovna-abrikosova/photo Findagrave for Mother Catherine Abrikosova]
The Life and Death of Mother Catherine Abrikosova (In English) by Pavel Parfentiev
 Prayers for the Beatification of Mother Catherine Abrikosova (In English)
 Book of Remembrance: Biographies of Catholic Clergy and Laity Repressed in the Soviet Union - Biography of Servant of God, Anna Ivanovna Abrikosova (Mother Catherine of Siena, OP), University of Notre Dame
 "Ekaterina Sienskaya Abrikosova - A Dominican Uniate Foundress in the Old Russia" By Fr. Aidan Nichols, O.P.
30 years after Berlin Wall fell, Catholics seek to recognize heroic Eastern European sisters by Jonathan Luxmoore, Global Sisters Report, Nov. 7, 2019.
 "Anna (1882-1936) and Vladimir (1880-1966) Abrikosov." From the Website of the Restored Firm of A.I. Abrikosov & Sons. (in Russian)
 Russian Catholics remember thousands killed under Communism, 7, November 2019, The Tablet'' by Jonathan Luxmoore
 "On the Seven Words Spoken by Jesus Christ from the Cross," by Mother Catherine Abrikosova (in Russian)
 "THE REGULAR TERTIARIES OF ST. DOMINIC IN RED MOSCOW," by Kathleen West. New Blackfriars, June 1925.

1882 births
1936 deaths
20th-century Eastern Catholic martyrs
20th-century Eastern Catholic nuns
20th-century Roman Catholic martyrs
20th-century Russian translators
20th-century Russian women writers
Burials at Donskoye Cemetery
Burials at Donskoy Monastery
Christian schools in Russia
Converts to Eastern Catholicism from Eastern Orthodoxy
Deaths from cancer in the Soviet Union
Deaths from spinal cancer
Dominican martyrs
Dominican Sisters
Eastern Catholic Dominican nuns
Eastern Catholic mystics
Eastern Catholic Servants of God
Eastern Catholic writers
Former Russian Orthodox Christians
Founders of Eastern Catholic religious communities
History of Catholic monasticism
People associated with Girton College, Cambridge
People who died in the Gulag
Prisoners who died in Soviet detention
Russian Eastern Catholics
Underground education
Venerated Dominicans
Writers from Moscow